On February 20, 2021, Longtail Aviation Flight 5504, an international cargo flight operated by Longtail Aviation from Maastricht, Netherlands, to New York, United States, suffered an engine failure shortly after departure that caused debris to fall to the ground near the Dutch town of Meerssen. Two people on the ground were slightly injured and there was property damage to buildings and cars. The Boeing 747-400(BCF) cargo plane diverted to Liege Airport with the failed engine shut down and landed there safely.

A criminal investigation was launched to determine if there was criminal negligence involved, but it was closed a month later with no finding of negligence. A separate aviation safety investigation was also launched by the Dutch Safety Board (OVV).

Accident 

On 20 February 2021 at 16:11 local time, coincidentally only a few hours before the similar United Airlines Flight 328 parts departing aircraft incident, a Boeing 747-400BCF registered in Bermuda (VQ-BWT), operating as Longtail Aviation flight LGT-5504, experienced a nominally contained engine failure shortly after departing Maastricht Aachen Airport in the Netherlands in a southerly direction. Nevertheless, two people were injured by debris that also fell in a residential area. An elderly woman suffered a head injury that was treated at a hospital, and a child suffered burns after touching a piece of debris on the ground. 

The converted freighter aircraft, originally delivered in 1991, was powered by four Pratt & Whitney PW4056-3 engines, a version of the earlier PW4000-94 engine. "A few seconds after the plane took off, air traffic control noted an engine fire and informed the pilots. They then switched off the engine concerned and sent out an emergency signal," according to Maastricht Aachen Airport. Metal parts of engine #1 (s/n P727441), believed to be turbine blades, came down in the Sint Josephstraat area of the village of Meerssen, approximately 2 km past the end of the runway. 

After entering a holding pattern over the Belgian Ardennes to dump fuel, the aircraft made a precautionary 3-engine landing without further incident.

A local fire department representative reported that multiple witness on the ground saw the aircraft flying with an active engine fire. Video of a 747 in flight with smoke trailing from one engine was also posted to Twitter. Falling debris damaged parked cars, and press accounts of the incident included a widely circulated photo of the destruction showing what appears to be a part of an engine blade wedged in the roof of a car like a knife stuck in a block of butter. Maastricht Airport spokesperson Hella Hendriks told Reuters: "Several cars were damaged and bits hit several houses. Pieces were found across the residential neighbourhood on roofs, gardens and streets." Meerssen police publicly requested that possible fragments be left in place to aid the investigation, but later asked residents to turn in the parts. Local residents reportedly collected over 200 pieces of the engine after what some described as a "rain of debris."

Investigation

The Dutch Safety Board (OVV) immediately started an exploratory investigation where researchers initially collect evidence to determine whether an extensive investigation is necessary. A spokeswoman for the OVV stated "We immediately started collecting debris on Saturday and are now also going to look at the aircraft itself." The Aviation Team of the Dutch national police also started an investigation to determine if there was criminal negligence, but they did not travel to Belgium to examine the aircraft, instead asking for assistance from their Belgian counterparts. The criminal negligence investigation was closed a month later finding no negligence or guilt.

Martin Amick, the CEO of Longtail Aviation, said, "we are now in the process of working closely with the Dutch, Belgian, Bermuda and UK authorities to understand the cause of this incident." CNN reported that Boeing technical advisers are supporting the U.S. National Transportation Safety Board with its investigation. The NTSB would be involved in the investigation since the Boeing 747 is built in the U.S. 

Europe's EASA aviation regulator said it was aware of the two Pratt & Whitney jet engine incidents, and was requesting information on the causes to determine what action may be needed. After receiving more information, EASA said the Longtail and United incidents were unrelated: "Nothing in the failure and root analysis show any similarity (between the two incidents) at this stage."

The aircraft and cargo were released two days after the incident, but the OVV retained the damaged engine and the "black box" recorders. Longtail Aviation dispatched a replacement engine on another of their 747 freighters to facilitate the repairs necessary for return to service. The aircraft was returned to service and has been seen servicing Maastricht Airport. 

As of July 2022 the OVV shows a "Shortened Investigation" is still ongoing.

Related events

In its news story on this incident, British newspaper The Guardian used a stock image of an Air China 747F cargo aircraft as its lead image. Chinese media reported that Air China demanded a formal public apology through its lawyers for the alleged negative impact on the company's image, and the Chinese Embassy in the UK requested that the newspaper make an immediate correction and apologize to the Chinese company. The Guardian changed the picture and left a note at the end of the report: "The photograph used to illustrate this article was changed on 23 February 2021 because an earlier image showed a Boeing 747 belonging to a carrier unrelated to events; it has been replaced with a generic image of a Boeing aircraft."

See also 
United Airlines Flight 328
Qantas Flight 32
United Airlines Flight 1175
Southwest Flight 1380

References 

Aviation accidents and incidents in 2021
Accidents and incidents involving the Boeing 747
February 2021 events in the Netherlands
2021 in the Netherlands
Aviation accidents and incidents in the Netherlands
Airliner accidents and incidents caused by engine failure